One million (1,000,000), or one thousand thousand, is the natural number following 999,999 and preceding 1,000,001. The word is derived from the early Italian millione (milione in modern Italian), from mille, "thousand", plus the augmentative suffix -one.

Physical quantities can also be expressed using the SI prefix mega (M), when dealing with SI units; for example, 1 megawatt (1 MW) equals 1,000,000 watts.

The meaning of the word "million" is common to the short scale and long scale numbering systems, unlike the larger numbers, which have different names in the two systems.

The million is sometimes used in the English language as a metaphor for a very large number, as in "Not in a million years" and "You're one in a million", or a hyperbole, as in "I've walked a million miles" and "You've asked a million-dollar question".

1,000,000 is also the square of 1000 and also the cube of 100.

Visualizing one million
Even though it is often stressed that counting to precisely a million would be an exceedingly tedious task due to the time and concentration required, there are many ways to bring the number "down to size" in approximate quantities, ignoring irregularities or packing effects.
 Information:  Not counting spaces, the text printed on 136 pages of an Encyclopædia Britannica, or 600 pages of pulp paperback fiction contains approximately one million characters.
 Length: There are one million millimetres in a kilometre, and roughly a million sixteenths of an inch in a mile (1 sixteenth = 0.0625). A typical car tire might rotate a million times in a  trip, while the engine would do several times that number of revolutions.
 Area: A square a thousand objects or units on a side contains a million such objects or square units, so a million holes might be found in less than three square yards of window screen, or similarly, in about one half square foot (400–500 cm2) of bed sheet cloth. A city lot 70 by 100 feet is about a million square inches.
 Volume: The cube root of one million is one hundred, so a million objects or cubic units is contained in a cube a hundred objects or linear units on a side. One million cubic inches would be the volume of a small room  feet long by  feet wide by  feet high.
 Mass: A million cubic millimetres (small droplets) of water would have a volume of one litre and a mass of one kilogram. A million millilitres or cubic centimetres (one cubic metre) of water has a mass of a million grams or one tonne.
 Weight: A million  honey bees would weigh the same as an  person.
 Computer: A display resolution of 1,280 by 800 pixels contains 1,024,000 pixels.
 Money: A USD bill of any denomination weighs . There are 454 grams in a pound. One million USD bills would weigh  or 1 tonne (just over 1 short ton).
 Time: A million seconds, 1 megasecond, is 11.57 days.

In Indian English and Pakistani English, it is also expressed as 10 lakh.

Selected 7-digit numbers (1,000,001–9,999,999)

1,000,001 to 1,999,999
 1,000,003 = Smallest 7-digit prime number
 1,000,405 = Smallest triangular number with 7 digits and the 1,414th triangular number
 1,002,001 = 10012, palindromic square
 1,006,301 = First number of the first pair of prime quadruplets occurring thirty apart ({1006301, 1006303, 1006307, 1006309} and {1006331, 1006333, 1006337, 1006339})
 1,024,000 = Sometimes, the number of bytes in a megabyte
 1,030,301 = 1013, palindromic cube
 1,037,718 = Large Schröder number
 1,048,576 = 10242 = 324 = 165 = 410 = 220, the number of bytes in a mebibyte (or often, a megabyte)
 1,048,976 = smallest 7 digit Leyland number
 1,058,576 = Leyland number
 1,058,841 = 76 x 32
 1,084,051 = fifth Keith prime
 1,089,270 = harmonic divisor number
 1,111,111 = repunit
 1,112,083 = logarithmic number
 1,129,30832 + 1 is prime
 1,136,689 = Pell number, Markov number
 1,174,281 = Fine number
 1,185,921 = 10892 = 334
 1,200,304 = 17 + 27 + 37 + 47 + 57 + 67 + 77 
 1,203,623 = smallest unprimeable number ending in 3
 1,234,321 = 11112, palindromic square
 1,262,180 = number of triangle-free graphs on 12 vertices
 1,278,818 = Markov number
 1,299,709 = 100,000th prime number
 1,336,336 = 11562 = 344
 1,346,269 = Fibonacci number, Markov number
 1,367,631 = 1113, palindromic cube
 1,413,721 = square triangular number
 1,419,857 = 175
 1,421,280 = harmonic divisor number
 1,441,440 = colossally abundant number, superior highly composite number
 1,441,889 = Markov number
 1,500,625 = 12252 = 354
 1,539,720 = harmonic divisor number
 1,563,372 = Wedderburn-Etherington number
 1,594,323 = 313
 1,596,520 = Leyland number
 1,606,137 = number of ways to partition {1,2,3,4,5,6,7,8,9} and then partition each cell (block) into subcells.
 1,607,521/1,136,689 ≈ √2
 1,647,086 = Leyland number
 1,671,800 = Initial number of first century xx00 to xx99 consisting entirely of composite numbers
 1,679,616 = 12962 = 364 = 68
 1,686,049 = Markov prime
 1,687,989 = number of square (0,1)-matrices without zero rows and with exactly 7 entries equal to 1
 1,730,787 = Riordan number
 1,741,725 = equal to the sum of the seventh power of its digits
 1,771,561 = 13312 = 1213 = 116, also, Commander Spock's estimate for the tribble population in the Star Trek episode "The Trouble with Tribbles"
 1,864,637 = k such that the sum of the squares of the first k primes is divisible by k.
 1,874,161 = 13692 = 374
 1,889,568 = 185
 1,928,934 = 2 x 39 x 72
 1,941,760 = Leyland number
 1,953,125 = 1253 = 59

2,000,000 to 2,999,999
 2,000,002 = number of surface-points of a tetrahedron with edge-length 1000
 2,000,376 = 1263
 2,012,174 = Leyland number
 2,012,674 = Markov number
 2,085,136 = 14442 = 384
 2,097,152 = 1283 = 87 = 221
 2,097,593 = Leyland prime
 2,124,679 = largest known Wolstenholme prime
 2,178,309 = Fibonacci number
 2,222,222 = repdigit
 2,313,441 = 15212 = 394
 2,356,779 = Motzkin number
 2,423,525 = Markov number
 2,476,099 = 195
 2,560,000 = 16002 = 404
 2,567,284 = number of partially ordered set with 10 unlabelled elements
 2,646,723 = little Schroeder number
 2,674,440 = Catalan number
 2,692,537 = Leonardo prime
 2,744,210 = Pell number
 2,796,203 = Wagstaff prime, Jacobsthal prime
 2,825,761 = 16812 = 414
 2,890,625 = 1-automorphic number
 2,922,509 = Markov prime
 2,985,984 = 17282 = 1443 = 126 = 1,000,00012 AKA a great-great-gross

3,000,000 to 3,999,999
 3,111,696 = 17642 = 424
 3,200,000 = 205
 3,263,442 = product of the first five terms of Sylvester's sequence
 3,263,443 = sixth term of Sylvester's sequence
 3,276,509 = Markov prime
 3,301,819 = alternating factorial
 3,333,333 = repdigit
 3,360,633 = palindromic in 3 consecutive bases: 62818269 = 336063310 = 199599111
 3,418,801 = 18492 = 434
 3,426,576 = number of free 15-ominoes
 3,524,578 = Fibonacci number, Markov number
 3,554,688 = 2-automorphic number
 3,626,149 = Wedderburn–Etherington prime
 3,628,800 = 10!
 3,748,096 = 19362 = 444
 3,880,899/2,744,210 ≈ √2

4,000,000 to 4,999,999
 4,008,004 = 20022, palindromic square
 4,037,913 = sum of the first ten factorials
 4,084,101 = 215
 4,100,625 = 20252 = 454
 4,194,304 = 20482 = 411 = 222
 4,194,788 = Leyland number
 4,208,945 = Leyland number
 4,210,818 = equal to the sum of the seventh powers of its digits
 4,213,597 = Bell number
 4,260,282 = Fine number
 4,297,512 = 12-th derivative of xx at x=1
 4,324,320 = colossally abundant number, superior highly composite number, pronic number
 4,400,489 = Markov number
 4,444,444 = repdigit
 4,477,456 = 21162 = 464
 4,782,969 = 21872 = 97 = 314
 4,782,974 = n such that n | (3n + 5)
 4,785,713 = Leyland number
 4,805,595 = Riordan number
 4,826,809 = 21972 = 1693 = 136
 4,879,681 = 22092 = 474

5,000,000 to 5,999,999
 5,134,240 = the largest number that cannot be expressed as the sum of distinct fourth powers
 5,153,632 = 225
 5,221,225 = 22852, palindromic square
 5,293,446 = Large Schröder number
 5,308,416 = 23042 = 484
 5,496,925 = first cyclic number in base 6
 5,555,555 = repdigit
 5,702,887 = Fibonacci number
 5,761,455 = The number of primes under 108
 5,764,801 = 24012 = 494 = 78
 5,882,353 = 5882 + 23532

6,000,000 to 6,999,999
 6,250,000 = 25002 = 504
 6,436,343 = 235
 6,536,382 = Motzkin number
 6,625,109 = Pell number, Markov number
 6,666,666 = repdigit
 6,765,201 = 26012 = 514
 6,948,496 = 26362, palindromic square

7,000,000 to 7,999,999
 7,109,376 = 1-automorphic number
 7,311,616 = 27042 = 524
 7,453,378 = Markov number
 7,529,536 = 27442 = 1963 = 146
 7,652,413 = Largest n-digit pandigital prime
 7,777,777 = repdigit
 7,779,311 = A hit song written by Prince and released in 1982 by The Time
 7,861,953 = Leyland number
 7,890,481 = 28092 = 534
 7,906,276 = pentagonal triangular number
 7,913,837 = Keith number
 7,962,624 = 245

8,000,000 to 8,999,999
 8,000,000 = Used to represent infinity in Japanese mythology
 8,108,731 = repunit prime in base 14
 8,388,607 = second composite Mersenne number with a prime exponent
 8,388,608 = 223
 8,389,137 = Leyland number
 8,399,329 = Markov number
 8,436,379 = Wedderburn-Etherington number
 8,503,056 = 29162 = 544
 8,675,309 = A hit song for Tommy Tutone (also a twin prime with 8,675,311)
 8,675,311 = Twin prime with 8,675,309
 8,888,888 = repdigit
 8,946,176 = self-descriptive number in base 8

9,000,000 to 9,999,999
 9,150,625 = 30252 = 554
 9,227,465 = Fibonacci number, Markov number
 9,369,319 = Newman–Shanks–Williams prime
 9,647,009 = Markov number
 9,653,449 = square Stella octangula number
 9,581,014 = n such that n | (3n + 5)
 9,663,500 = Initial number of first century xx00 to xx99 that possesses an identical prime pattern to any century with four or fewer digits: its prime pattern of {9663503, 9663523, 9663527, 9663539, 9663553, 9663581, 9663587} is identical to {5903, 5923, 5927, 5939, 5953, 5981, 5987}
 9,694,845 = Catalan number
 9,699,690 = eighth primorial
 9,765,625 = 31252 = 255 = 510
 9,800,817 = equal to the sum of the seventh powers of its digits
 9,834,496 = 31362 = 564
 9,865,625 = Leyland number
 9,926,315 = equal to the sum of the seventh powers of its digits
 9,938,375 = 2153, the largest 7-digit cube
 9,997,156 = largest triangular number with 7 digits and the 4,471st triangular number
 9,998,244 = 31622, the largest 7-digit square
 9,999,991 = Largest 7-digit prime number
 9,999,999 = repdigit

See also 
 Huh (god), depictions of whom were also used in hieroglyphs to represent one million
 Megagon
 Millionaire
 Names of large numbers
 Orders of magnitude (numbers) to help compare dimensionless numbers between 1,000,000 and 10,000,000 (106 and 107)
.

References

1000000
Large numbers